Horkelia parryi is a species of flowering plant in the rose family known by the common name Parry's horkelia. It is endemic to California, where it grows in the chaparral of the Sierra Nevada foothills. This is a low, mat-forming perennial herb growing in unobtrusive green patches on the ground. The leaves are 5 to 10 centimeters long and are each made up of small, toothed, oval-shaped leaflets. The somewhat hairy green to reddish-green stems are 10 to 30 centimeters (4 to 12 inches) long and bear inflorescences of a few flowers each. The flower has minute bractlets under larger, pointed sepals and five white petals. The center of the flower contains a ring of stamens around a patch of up to 50 thready pistils.

References

External links
Jepson Manual Treatment
Photo gallery

parryi
Flora of California